Goldhaber is a German surname meaning "gold oats"; or "possessor of gold". Notable people with the surname include:

Gerson Goldhaber (1924–2010), German-born American physicist 
Gertrude Scharff Goldhaber (1911–1998), German-American physicist
Marcus Goldhaber (born 1978), American jazz vocalist and band leader
Maurice Goldhaber (1911–2011), Austro-Hungarian-born American physicist 
Nat Goldhaber, American venture capitalist, computer entrepreneur and politician
Sulamith Goldhaber (1923–1965), Austrian-born American physicist

References

German-language surnames
Jewish surnames
Yiddish-language surnames